Without You is a Karen Mok album released in 2006.  Most of the lyrics are in Mandarin, though two tracks are in Cantonese.

Track listing
 野
 一口一口 (Yì Kǒu Yì Kǒu, "One Mouthful, One Mouthful")
 如果没有你 (Rúguǒ Méiyǒu Nǐ, "Without You")
 24 hrs
 一个人睡 (Yígè Rén Shuǐ, "Sleeping Alone")
 甜美生活 (Tiānměi Shēnghuǒ, "Happy Life")
 手 (Shǒu, "Hand")
 薄荷 (Bòhe, "Peppermint")
 AM PM
 天下大同 (Tiān Xià Dà Tóng, "Same World") (Writer: Jay Chou)
 Fire
 24 hrs (Cantonese)
 众生缘 (Cantonese)

Style

In this album, Mok experimented with rock genres, such as grunge/post-grunge, alternative rock, alternative pop and pop rock. "天下大同" (Tiān Xià Dà Tóng, "Same World") was an urban-influenced pop rock track. "24 hrs" was a violin-driven alternative rock song about a love-hate relationship with prominent use of grunge-like electric guitar chords during the chorus and acoustic guitar during the verses. It is a cover of the song "24" by Jem. "Shou" is a hard rock/hard pop song inspired by rock and roll. "Fire" is an acoustic pop-rock song.

References
莫文蔚 如果没有你 (Chinese)

2006 albums
Karen Mok albums
Cantonese-language albums